The sixth and last election to Highland Regional Council was held on 5 May 1994 as part of the wider 1994 Scottish regional elections and British local elections. The election saw the Independent administration maintaining their control.

Aggregate results

Ward results

References

1994 Scottish local elections
1994